Anonymus Bele regis notarius ("Anonymous Notary of King Bela") or Master P. ( late 12th century – early 13th century) was the notary and chronicler of a Hungarian king, probably Béla III. Little is known about him, but his latinized name began with P, as he referred to himself as "P. dictus magister". 

Anonymus is famous for his work Gesta Hungarorum ("The Deeds of the Hungarians"), written in Medieval Latin around 1200. This work provides the most detailed history of the arrival of the Hungarian conquest of the Carpathian Basin. Most of his attempts to explain the origin of several Hungarian place names are unsupported by modern etymology.

Identity
The identity of the author of the Gesta has always been subject to scholarly debate. Although the first words of the opening sentencean initial "P" followed with the words "dictus magister ac quondam bone memorie gloriosissimi Bele regis Hungarie notarius"describe him, they cannot be interpreted unambiguously. First of all, the interpretation of the "P dictus magister" text is unclear. The text may refer to a man whose monogram was P or it may be an abbreviation of the Latin word for "aforementioned" (praedictus) in reference to a name on the title page which is now missing. Most scholars accept the former version, translating the text as "P who is called magister, and sometime notary of the most glorious Béla, king of Hungary of fond memory".

In his 1937 study, historian Loránd Szilágyi identified Anonymus with a certain Peter, a canon, alter provost of the cathedral chapter of Esztergom. Several authors shared his view until 1966, when literary journal Irodalomtörténeti Közlemények published the papers of János Horváth, Jr. and Károly Sólyom, who claimed Anonymus was identical with Peter, Bishop of Győr. The renowned historian György Györffy refused their theory in 1970 and considered authorship of a Peter, who served as provost of Buda, despite the fact that there is no data on the existence of such a person.

References

Sources 

Anonymus, Notary of King Béla: The Deeds of the Hungarians (Edited, Translated and Annotated by Martyn Rady and László Veszprémy) (2010). In: Rady, Martyn; Veszprémy, László; Bak, János M. (2010); Anonymus and Master Roger; CEU Press; .

External links 
 Text of the Gesta Hungarorum

Hungarian chroniclers
Hungarian writers
12th-century Latin writers
13th-century Latin writers
Unidentified people
12th-century Hungarian people
13th-century Hungarian people
13th-century Hungarian historians